A no-win situation, also called a lose-lose situation, is one where a person has choices, but no choice leads to a net gain. For example, if a company finds a dangerous fault in one of its products, they can either issue a product recall and take some reputational damage, or allow the product to harm people: the company is in a no-win situation.

In game theory
In game theory, a "no-win" situation is a circumstance in which no player benefits from any outcome, hence ultimately losing the match. This may be because of any or all of the following:
 Unavoidable or unforeseeable circumstances causing the situation to change after decisions have been made. This is common in text adventures.
 Zugzwang, as in chess, when any move a player chooses makes them worse off than before such as losing a piece or being checkmated.
 A situation in which the player has to accomplish two mutually dependent tasks each of which must be completed before the other or that are mutually exclusive (a Catch-22).
 Ignorance of other players' actions, meaning the best decision for all differs from that for any one player (as in the prisoner's dilemma).

In history
Carl von Clausewitz's advice never to launch a war that one has not already won characterizes war as a no-win situation. A similar example is the Pyrrhic victory in which a military victory is so costly that the winning side actually ends up worse off than before it started. Looking at the victory as a part of a larger situation, the situation could either be no-win, or more of a win for the other side than the one that won the "victory", or victory at such cost that the gains are outweighed by the cost and are no longer a source of joy.

For example, the "victorious" side may have accomplished their objective, which may have been worthless; it may also lose a strategic advantage in manpower or positioning. For example, the British Empire was one of the victorious powers of the Second World War but was so weakened that it could no longer maintain its status as a great power in a world that became dominated by the United States and the Soviet Union.

A related concept is sometimes described as winning the battle but losing the war. Then a lesser objective is then won, but the true objective beyond it is not well pursued and is lost.

In the past in Europe, those accused of being witches were sometimes bound and then thrown or dunked in water to test their innocence. A witch would float (by calling upon the devil to save her from drowning), and then be executed, but a woman not a witch would drown (proving her innocence but causing her death).

In video games 

Many text adventures, graphical adventure games and role-playing video games can reach an unwinnable state where it has become impossible for the player to win the game (either due to a bug or by design), and where the only options are restarting the game, loading a previously saved game, wandering indefinitely, or a game over (a negative game end, such as death). This is also known as a dead end situation.

A softlock is a state in a game that prevents the player from continuing without the computer freezing and rendering the game unplayable. Usually, this is the result of the player's previous choices, and not due to the game itself lacking a path to victory.

Unwinnable states are usually not fatal in games that utilize checkpoints or are divided into levels in which progress cannot be saved midway through one, allowing players to reload a checkpoint or restart the level to reverse an unwinnable situation. However, in other games, softlocks may cripple or corrupt save files, forcing the player to start completely anew from the very beginning of the game in order to get further in the game. For example, in games such as Goldeneye 007, Perfect Dark, and TimeSplitters, the level does not end once a player fails an objective short of being killed, but it is impossible to progress to the next level no matter what the player does afterwards. Other games take steps to avoid unwinnable situations; for example, a game may not allow players to drop items which are necessary to continue. Softlocks can be triggered by incorrect manipulation of game code or mechanics, as seen in speedrunning – should a certain sequence of tasks to perform a sequence break be carried out incorrectly, the game may become softlocked, forcing either a restart of the game or the console altogether.

Unwinnable should not be confused with unbeatable, which is used to describe a character, monster, or puzzle that is too powerful or difficult to be overcome by the player or character at a lower standing, and is normally found in role-playing video games. In many cases, "unbeatable" gamestates occur because of integer overflow or other errors programmers did not take into account, called a kill screen. In this situation, the game may also crash.

In other media 
In the film WarGames, the supercomputer WOPR simulates all possible games of tic-tac-toe as a metaphor for all possible scenarios of a nuclear war, each of them ending in a nuclear holocaust (mutual assured destruction). The computer then exclaims: "A strange game; the only winning move is not to play".

In the Star Trek canon, the Kobayashi Maru simulation is a no-win scenario designed as a character test for command track cadets at Starfleet Academy. It first appears in the film Star Trek II: The Wrath of Khan. In the film, Admiral James T. Kirk states that he does not believe in the no-win scenario.

In the TV show Quantico, the agents are put in a terrorist hijack flight simulation mission that is unbeatable.

See also

 Catch-22 (logic)
 Cornelian dilemma
 Double bind
 Kobayashi Maru
 Morton's fork
 Preparedness paradox
 Pyrrhic victory
 Setting up to fail
 Two-body problem (career)
 Vladimir's choice
 Winner's curse
 Win-win game
 Zero-sum game
 Zugzwang

References

External links
 Leon F. Seltzer Ph.D (2013): Two Ways to "Win" in a No-Win Situation

Game theory
Metaphors referring to war and violence